Head Up High is the tenth studio album by Swedish singer Pandora, released in Finland on 30 March 2011 and worldwide in November 2011.

Track listing 
 "Every 2nd"  (featuring Eric Martin)  – 3:24
 "You Woke My Heart"  (featuring JS16)  – 3:13
 "Why (Magistral)"  (featuring Stacy)  – 3:33
 "Head Up High" – 3:07
 "You Believed"  (featuring Matt Hewie)  – 3:35
 "Kitchy Kitchy"  (featuring Bloom 06)  – 3:15
 "Every Time"  (featuring Neo Cartoon Lover)  – 3:37
 "Hope (Is All I Have)" – 3:45
 "Until the Hurt is Gone" – 3:10
 "I Found Love" – 4:05
 "Wild Boys"	 – 3:40
 "Off the Hook" – 3:17
 "Turn It Over" – 3:18
 "Ice Cream"  (featuring Taz)  – 3:21
 "Why"  (English Version)  – 3:27
 "You Believed" (Slow Piano String Version) – 3:30

Release history

References 

2011 albums
Pandora (singer) albums